Edwin L. Harper (born November 13, 1941) is an American businessman who served in the Nixon Administration as a section chief in the Domestic Council and in the Reagan Administration as the Deputy Director of the Office of Management and Budget from 1981 to 1982 and as the Assistant to the President for Policy Development from 1982 to 1983. He was previously a professor of the history of the American presidency at Rutgers University.

He graduated from Principia College in 1963, and earned a Ph.D. in political science from the University of Virginia in 1968. He has been vice president of Emerson Electric, executive vice president of the Campbell Soup Company, president and CEO of the Association of American Railroads, and chief operating officer of American Security Group.

In 1982, Harper was elected elected as a fellow of the National Academy of Public Administration.

References

1941 births
Living people
American Christian Scientists
Deputy Directors for Management of the Office of Management and Budget
Illinois Republicans
Nixon administration personnel
People from Belleville, Illinois
Principia College alumni
Reagan administration personnel
Rutgers University faculty
University of Virginia alumni